is a Prefectural Natural Park in Fukuoka Prefecture, Japan. Established in 1950, the park spans the municipalities of Yame, Chikugo, Miyama, and Ōmuta.

See also
 National Parks of Japan
 List of Places of Scenic Beauty of Japan

References

Parks and gardens in Fukuoka Prefecture
Protected areas established in 1950
1950 establishments in Japan